Lygniodes hypopyrrha is a moth of the family Erebidae. It is found in the Philippines (Mindanao).

References

Moths described in 1913
Lygniodes